This is a list of the original 124 Pink Panther animated shorts produced between December 18, 1964, and February 1, 1980, by DePatie–Freleng Enterprises (DFE Films). 92 shorts were released theatrically. The first 62 entries appeared on Saturday mornings via The Pink Panther Show under the same umbrella title starting in 1969 on NBC. All 32 made-for-television entries were also distributed to theaters after initially airing on The Pink Panther Show under the title The All New Pink Panther Show in 1978 on ABC, respectively. Every short in the series includes the word "Pink" in the title.

The Pink Panther's long-time foil, known as the Little Man, appeared in many entries except where noted.

1960s

1964

1965

1966

1967

1968

1969

1970s

1971

1972

1974

1975

1976

1977

1978–1980 (TV) 
The following made-for-television entries were produced for The All New Pink Panther Show in 1978. Initially premiering on television in late 1978, they were all later released theatrically. New music cues were composed by Steve DePatie, son of series producer David H. DePatie.

References

External links 
 

Film series introduced in 1964
 
Lists of American children's animated television series episodes
Lists of animated films by character
Lists of American comedy television series episodes
Lists of animated cartoons